The Innovation an Digital Development Agency is a government organization, which had been established for the purpose of assisting local business entities  in acquiring modern technologies and  technological solutions, organizing their transfer, supporting innovation-oriented scientific research and encouraging innovative projects, including startups by funding them through grants, concessional loans and venture capital fund.

Founding
According to the Decree of President of the Republic of Azerbaijan Ilham Aliyev “On some measures to improve governance in the field of digitalization, innovation, high technologies and communications in the Republic of Azerbaijan” dated October 11, 2021, a public legal entity Innovation and Digital Development Agency was established under the Ministry of Digital Development and Transport.

Main purposes and responsibilities 
Public legal entity Innovation and Digital Development Agency:

 Provides organization, coordination, implementation (including control and regulation) of activities in the field of digital transformation;
 Carries out extensive measures, scientific, scientific and technical, innovative activities and relevant experiences in the field of high technologies, nuclear sciences, nuclear technologies and nuclear energetics;
 Provides assistance to individuals and legal entities in the acquisition of modern technologies and technological solutions, encourages innovative research and innovative projects (including startups), promotes innovative initiative, providing them with financial support.

Board of Directors 
Under the order of the President of the Republic of Azerbaijan from 5 Auqust, 2019, Tural Kerimli had been appointed as a chairman of Innovation Agency.

See also
Ministry of Transport, Communications and High Technologies (Azerbaijan)
State Fund for Development of IT

References

Economy of Azerbaijan
Government agencies of Azerbaijan
Communications in Azerbaijan